The Indian general election, 2009 in Odisha were held for 21 seats with the state going to the polls in the first two phases of the general elections. The major contenders in the state were the Third Front, Indian National Congress and the Bharatiya Janata Party (BJP). The third front parties contesting in the state were the Biju Janata Dal (BJD), the Left parties and the Nationalist Congress Party. The assembly elections were held simultaneously with the general elections in the state.

A few weeks before the elections, seat sharing talks broke down between the BJD and its long-time ally BJP.  Then the BJD joined the Third Front. The BJD leader Naveen Patnaik said that he broke the alliance with BJP over the Kandhamal riots.

Voting and results
Source: Election Commission of India

List of elected MPs

References

Indian general elections in Odisha
Odisha
Odisha-related lists
2000s in Orissa